The Diocese of Dices, is a titular see of the Roman Catholic Church. The location of the seat of the diocese is unknown for certain, but is perhaps identifiable with Henchir-Sidi-Salah, Tunisia. Henchir Sidi Salah was an ancient diocese in the Roman-Berber province of Byzacena.

There are two bishops documented in antiquity as being bishops of Dices.
The Catholic, Massimino who attended the Council of Carthage (411) (There appears to have been at that time no Donatist bishops in Dices.)
Candido who participated in the Council of Carthage (641).

Dices is now a titular bishopric of the Roman Catholic Church. The current bishop is Henryk Ciereszko, of Białystok.

References

Roman towns and cities in Africa (Roman province)
Former populated places in Tunisia
Archaeological sites in Tunisia
Dices
Catholic titular sees in Africa
Former Roman Catholic dioceses in Africa